Richland High School is a public secondary school in the northwest United States, located in Richland, Washington. The school was founded as Columbia High School in 1910 to serve the educational needs of the small town of Richland. The building was replaced with a much larger structure by the U.S. Army Corps of Engineers in 1946 as the development of the neighboring Hanford Engineering Works brought an influx of employees to the region to support the war effort.

Columbia High was renamed Richland High School as the small farming community continued to develop as weapons production climbed during the Cold War and the town was designated as a first class city in 1958. The facilities of were extensively renovated in 1964, and remodeled again in stages between 1995 and 2006. The school is now part of the Richland School District. Until the founding of Hanford Falcons in 1972, Richland High was the only high school in the city.

Richland's mascot is the "Bomber", officially named for the Boeing B-17 Flying Fortress built in Seattle, but also in recognition of the city's contributions as an "Atomic City" in World War Two. Hanford was home to the Manhattan Project's B Reactor, the first full-scale plutonium production reactor in the world. Plutonium manufactured at the site was used in the nuclear bomb detonated over Nagasaki, Japan. Mushroom cloud logos are proudly displayed throughout the school and the student body used to shout "nuke 'em" at sporting events.

In 2019, "Archie" a B-17 Ball Turret Gunner was named the first-ever character mascot at Richland High School. The mascot is named after Archie Purcell, a WWII veteran who was a ball turret gunner on the famous B-17 "A Days Pay".

As the region has diversified since its past as a federally owned Atomic City where 90% of the population was either employed by or a dependent of Hanford, the school has since received criticism for its depiction of a mushroom cloud as an unofficial logo for the school, believing that the logo and the mascot to be a shameful reminder of the atomic bombs dropped on Hiroshima and Nagasaki.

Athletics

Richland High has an enrollment of roughly 2,000; its WIAA classification is 4A, for the state's largest schools. The football stadium, which is used for both Richland and Hanford High School events, is located immediately adjacent to the grounds of Richland High School, and was named Fran Rish Stadium in his honor in 1986.

Football
The Bombers were state champions in 1981, 1999, and 2017, and played in the title game in 1975, 1996, and 2016. The 2017 team was coached by Mike Neidhold, the 1999 team by Lonnie Pierson, and the 1981 team by J.D. Covington.

Cross country
Richland was a cross country power in the early 1970s, winning a then-record five straight AAA state boys' titles under coaches Max Jensen (1970–72) and Mike Hepper (1973–74).  Jensen went on to be a successful coach at Spokane Community College.  The RHS girls' cross-country team won the state championship in 1993 under coach Mike Mills, and also qualified for state in 2005 and 2006.

Soccer
RHS has a very strong girls and boys soccer program. The 1999 state champion team, led by future United States World Cup and gold medal-winning goalkeeper Hope Solo, was undefeated and ranked fourth in the nation. Both the boys' and girls' team were state champions in 2003.

Octavio DoValle Sr. has been the Richland High School boys soccer coach since 1987.  Under his direction, the soccer program built the first dedicated high school soccer stadium in the state.

Baseball
Richland High School's baseball team has been highly successful, winning four state titles in eleven years (1999, 2005, 2007, 2009), and another in 2018. This was especially impressive considering the football team had won state earlier in that same school year. Former coach Ben Jacobs is the winningest coach in school history with over 400 wins. One of Jacobs' notable alumni is Travis Buck of the Cleveland Indians, formerly of the Oakland Athletics.

Basketball
Richland has won three state championships in boys' basketball, most recently in 1979, a team led on the floor by Mark Hoke, Bob Kennedy, and Brian Kellerman. Previous state titles were in 1972   made the state semi-finals seven times in eight years in the 1970s, advancing to  In the 1960s, they won the third place game four times  Kellerman was a four-year starter at Idaho, a top ten team in 1982, and he was the Big Sky player of the year as a

Golf 
Richland High School has had a strong boys golf program since the late 1960s. The Bombers won back to back state golf titles in 1968 and 1969.   RHS won three state championships in the span of five years between 2000 and 2005. In 2016 the school placed second in the state.

Alumni

James Albaugh: Class of 1968 – former CEO of Boeing Commercial Airplanes
Kayla Barron: NASA astronaut, and submarine warfare officer.
Travis Buck: Class of 2002 – MLB outfielder
Gene Conley: Class of 1948 – MLB pitcher and NBA forward
Larry Coryell: Class of 1961 – musician, jazz fusion guitarist
Kathleen Flenniken: Class of 1978 – poet, Washington State Poet Laureate
Santino Fontana: Class of 2000 – stage actor, director, and composer
Liz Heaston: Class of 1997 – soccer and football, first woman to score a point in a college football game
Kurt Kafentzis: former NFL defensive back
Mark Kafentzis: former NFL defensive back
Brian Kellerman: Class of 1979 - basketball player
John Lesko: Class of 2006 – USSF Division 2 Professional League defender
James Mattis: Class of 1968 – USMC General, commander of U.S. Central Command, and Secretary of Defense
John Meyers: Class of 1958 – NFL defensive tackle
Greg Olson: Class of 1981 – NFL assistant coach
Michael Peterson: Class of 1977 – singer, country singer
Leon Rice: Class of 1981 – basketball coach at Boise State University
Kathryn Ruemmler – White House Counsel to President Barack Obama June 2011 – June 2014
Westley Allan Dodd: Class of 1979 - American serial killer
Hope Solo: Class of 1999 – U.S. Soccer Federation and Women's Professional Soccer goalkeeper
Sharon Tate: Class of 1961 (attended) – actress
Mark Watrous: Class of 1996 – Guitarist for The Shins
Eric Yardley: Class of 2009 – MLB pitcher

References

External links

Richland, Washington
High schools in Benton County, Washington
Tri-Cities, Washington
Educational institutions established in 1910
School buildings completed in 1910
School buildings completed in 1944
Public high schools in Washington (state)
1910 establishments in Washington (state)